The Charding Nullah, traditionally known as the Lhari stream and called Demchok River by China, is a small river that originates near the Charding La pass that is also on the border between the two countries and flows northeast to join the Indus River near a peak called "Demchok Karpo" or "Lhari Karpo" (white holy peak of Demchok). There are villages on both sides of the mouth of the river called by the same name "Demchok", which is presumed to have been a single village originally, and has gotten split into two due to geopolitcal reasons. The river serves as the de facto border between China and India in the southern part of the Demchok sector.

Etymology 
The Indian government refers to the river as "Charding Nullah" after its place of origin, the Charding La pass, with nullah meaning a mountain stream.

The Chinese government uses the term "Demchok river" by the location of its mouth, near the Demchok Karpo peak and the Demchok village.

Some of the historical documents call the river "Lhari stream". Lhari, meaning "holy mountain" in Tibetan, is a reference to the white rocky peak (4,865 m) behind the Ladakhi Demchok village. It has also been referred to as "Lari Karpo" ("white lhari") and "Demchok Lari Karpo" in Tibetan documents.

"Lhari stream at Demchok" is the phrase used in the 1684 Treaty of Tingmosgang, forming the basis for the Indian government's identification of the stream with Charding Nullah. The Indian identification is supported by scholars.

Description

Source
The Charding Nullah originates below the Charding La pass, which is on a large spur that divides the Sutlej river basin from the Indus river basin. In this area, the Sutlej river tributaries flow southeast into West Tibet and the Indus river and its tributaries flow northwest, parallel to the Himalayan ranges.

Charding–Nilung Nullah Junction
The Charding Nullah flows northeast along a narrow mountain valley. Halfway down the valley it is joined by another nullah from the left, called Nilung (or Nilu/Ninglung). The Charding–Nilung Nullah Junction (CNNJ, 4900 m) is recognised by both the Indian and Chinese border troops as a strategic point.

Changthang plateau

The entire area surrounding the Charding Nullah is referred to as the Changthang  plateau. It consists of rocky mountain heights of Ladakh and Kailas ranges and sandy river valleys which are only good for grazing yaks, sheep and goats (the famous pashmina goats) reared by Changpa nomads. The Indian-controlled northern side of the nullah is close to Hanle, the site of the Hanle Monastery. The Chinese-controlled southern side has the village of Tashigang (Zhaxigang) which also has a monastery, both having been built by the Ladakhi ruler Sengge Namgyal. At the end of Tibet–Ladakh–Mughal War, the Tibetan troops retreated to Tashigang where they fortified themselves.

Mouth
At the bottom of the valley, the Charding Nullah branches into a 2 km-wide delta as it joins the Indus river. During the British colonial period, there were villages on both the sides of the delta, going by the name "Demchok". The southern village appears to have been the main one, frequently referred to by travelers.

Sino-Indian border dispute 
Prior to the Sino-Indian War of 1962, India had established a border post to the south of the delta (called "High Ground"). As the war progressed, the post was evacuated and the Chinese forces occupied it.

Notes

References

Bibliography 

 
 
 Indian Report: ; ; ; 
 Chinese report: ; ; ;

External links 
 Demchok Eastern Sector on OpenStreetMap (Chinese-controlled)
 Demchok Western Sector on OpenStreetMap (Indian-controlled)

International rivers of Asia
Indus basin
Rivers of China
Rivers of India
Rivers of Jammu and Kashmir
Rivers of Tibet
Geography of Ladakh
Geography of Tibet
History of Ladakh
History of Tibet